Bódog (Felix) Somló (1873–1920) was a Hungarian legal scholar of Jewish heritage. Along with Hans Kelsen and Georg Jellinek, he belonged to the range of Austrian Legal Positivists.

He was a professor at the University of Kolozsvár. In 1920, he committed suicide out of disgust at the cession of his university to the Romanian state, an action that had taken place the previous year.

References

1873 births
1920 deaths
Hungarian jurists
Academic staff of Franz Joseph University

Hungarian Jews
1920 suicides
Suicides in Romania
Scholars from the Austro-Hungarian Empire